John Millard Ferren (October 17, 1905 – July 1, 1970) was an American artist and educator. He was active from 1920 until 1970 in San Francisco, Paris and New York City.

Early life
John Ferren was born in Pendleton, Oregon on October 17, 1905, on the Blackfoot Indian Reservation. His parents were Verna Zay (née Westfall) and James William Ferren, his father served in the Army and the family moved often. In 1911, the family settled down in San Francisco, California.

In 1925, he briefly attended the California School of Fine Arts (now known as San Francisco Art Institute). In his 20s, he apprenticed as a stonecutter in San Francisco and producing portrait busts.

Career

Paris 
In 1929, he traveled to New York City and Paris. While in Paris, Ferren attended classes at the Sorbonne, Académie de la Grande Chaumière, and Académie Ranson. Although for the most part not formally educated, preferring to develop his art through an adventurous life style, and interaction with other artists, he was known as an intellectual among his peers. He wrote many published articles on abstract art and art theory. His writing and artwork appears in three issues of the influential magazine; It is. A Magazine for Abstract Art (1958-1965). While in Paris, Ferren was part of the community of artists working in Europe in the 1920s and 30s, including Marcel Duchamp, Max Ernst, Hans Hofmann, Joaquín Torres-García, Alberto Giacometti, Henri Matisse, Joan Miró, Piet Mondrian, and Pablo Picasso. He became friendly with Picasso, who mentored him, and together they stretched the canvas for Picasso's large 1937 painting Guernica. 

He briefly returned to the United States in 1930, returning to Paris soon after, where he remained until 1938. He was liked to the group Abstraction-Création.  He was the only artist who was both an inner-circle member of the Parisian avant garde of the 1930s, and the New York School abstract expressionists of the 1940s and 1950s. Gertrude Stein, remarked of Ferren in her 1937 book Everybody's Autobiography: "He is the only American painter foreign painters in Paris consider a painter and whose painting interests them.

He worked at Atelier 17 with Stanley William Hayter, and learned about a nineteenth-century printing technique, the engraving plate is imprinted in wet plaster, and when dried, is then carved and painted.

New York 
In 1938, he moved to New York City. He was a founding member (and later president) of The Club, a group of artists who were at the heart of the emerging New York School of abstract expressionism. He befriended Yun Gee, and through Gee, he became interested Taoism and Zen Buddhism.

He taught at the Brooklyn Museum Art School, starting in 1946. Additionally he taught at Cooper Union (1946), Queens College (1952–1970), ArtCenter College of Design, Pasadena, California, and the University of California, Los Angeles. During this time, he lived in a home and summer studio he designed and built in Brentwood, California.

In the 1950s, Ferren collaborated with Alfred Hitchcock. In the 1955 film The Trouble With Harry, the artworks of main character Sam Marlowe were painted by Ferren. In the 1958 film Vertigo, Ferren created the Jimmy Stewart nightmare sequence as well as the haunting, Portrait of Carlotta.

Beirut 
Ferren was selected as the first US State Department's Artist in Residence, and spent one year ('63–'64) residing in Beirut, Lebanon with his family. They lived on the second floor of the famous Beirut landmark building The Pink House (sometimes Rose House) which also served as his studio. While lin the middle east he had several exhibitions, including at the American University of Beirut, and travel throughout the region giving lectures on his work, and American Abstract Expressionism. His presence there was captured in an art project by painter Tom Young, in 2014–2015.

East Hampton 
Ferren, along with friend and fellow painter Willem de Kooning, purchased adjacent land and a house, to which he added a studio, from sculptor Wilfred Zogbaum in 1959. A few years after returning from Beirut, the Ferren's moved from New York City to live and paint full-time in East Hampton, however he also maintained a studio in New York at 147 Spring Street (sharing the building with Robert Wilson's Byrd Hoffman School of Byrds), as he was simultaneously a professor teaching color and painting, and serving as chairman of the art department for CUNY, Queens College. This was a very prolific period for them both, and the Ferren's remained active members of the East Hampton artist community, for the remainder of their lives. Both of their works can be seen as prominent parts of the Guild Hall Museum permanent collection[37], and on exhibit at the Smithsonian American Art Museum permanent collection, along with their son's Bran Ferren.

Personal life 
His first marriage was in 1932 to Laure Ferren (née Ortiz de Zarate), the daughter of Manuel Ortiz de Zarate, and ended in divorce by 1938. His second marriage was in 1941, to Inez Ferren (née Chatfield), and ended in divorce by 1948.

While teaching at Brooklyn Museum Art School, he met Rae Tonkel, one of his students and an Impressionist painter. Ferren married Rae Ferren (née Tonkel) in 1949, when she was age 20 and he was age 44. Rae Ferren died on September 6, 2016. Their son, Bran Ferren, is a noted designer, technologist, inventor, and businessman.

Death 
Ferren died of cancer at the Southampton Hospital in Southampton, New York in 1970. He is buried at Green River Cemetery in East Hampton, New York.

Museum permanent collections 
His work is in various public museum collections including:

 Smithsonian American Art Museum, Washington DC
 Solomon R. Guggenheim Museum, New York City, New York
 The Museum of Modern Art, New York City, New York
 The Los Angeles County Museum of Art, Los Angeles, California
 The Whitney Museum of American Art, New York City, New York
 Peggy Guggenheim Collection in Venice, Italy
 The San Francisco Museum of Modern Art, San Francisco, California
 The High Museum of Art, Atlanta, Georgia
 The Detroit Institute of Arts, Detroit, Michigan
 Oklahoma City Museum of Art, Oklahoma City, Oklahoma
 Sheldon Museum of Art, Lincoln, Nebraska
Indianapolis Museum of Art, Indianapolis, Indiana
 The Newberry Library, Chicago, Illinois 
Guild Hall of East Hampton, East Hampton, New York
 The Hirschhorn Museum & Sculpture Garden
 Pennsylvania Academy of Fine Arts, Philadelphia, Pennsylvania
 The Phillips Collection, Washington DC
 Blanton Museum of Art, Austin, Texas
 Davidson Art Center, Wesleyan University, Middletown, Connecticut
 Parrish Art Museum, Water Mill, New York
 Amon Carter Museum of American Art, Fort Worth, Texas
 John Raimondi Collection
 Newark Art Museum, Newark, New Jersey
 Neuberger Museum of Art, Purchase, New York
 The National Gallery of Art
 The Fine Arts Museum of San Francisco, San Francisco, California
 Weatherspoon Art Museum
 Albright-Knox Art Gallery, Buffalo, New York
 US Embassy, Paris, France
 Santa Barbara Museum of Art
 Islip Art Museum, Islip, New York
 Lowe Art Museum, Miami, Florida
 Yale University Art Gallery, New Haven, Connecticut

Exhibitions 
A list of select exhibitions by John Ferren.

 1923-1930 – San Francisco Art Association, San Francisco, California
1932 – Los Angeles Art Association, San Francisco, California
1932 – Galerie Zak, Paris, France
 1936 – Galerie Pierre, Paris, France
 1936 – San Francisco Museum of Modern Art, San Francisco, California
 1936 – Minneapolis Institute of Art, Minneapolis, Minnesota
 1936–1938 – Pierre Matisse Gallery, New York City, New York
 1937 – Arts Club of Chicago, Chicago Illinois
1939 – Pennsylvania Academy of Fine Arts, Pennsylvania 
 1940 – Pierre Loeb Galerie, Paris, France (3 shows)
 1940 – The Corcoran Gallery, Washington, D.C.
1941 –  Corcoran Gallery, Washington D.C.
 1942 – Peggy Guggenheim's Art of This Century Gallery, New York City, New York
1946 – Detroit Institute of Art, Maryland 
1947 – Art Institute of Chicago, Illinois
 1947–1949 – Kleeman Gallery, New York City, New York
1950 – Museum of New Mexico, New Mexico
 1951 – 9th Street Art Exhibition, New York City, New York
1951 – Whitney Museum of American Art, New York City, New York
 1952 – Santa Barbara Museum of Art, Santa Barbara, California
1953 – Iolas Gallery, New York
 1954–1958 – The Stable Gallery, New York City, New York (5 shows)
 1955 – Norton Simon Museum, Pasadena, California
1955 – Whitney Museum of American Art, New York City, New York
1956 – Whitney Museum of American Art, New York City, New York
 1956 – The Stable Gallery, New York
1957 – Arts Club of Chicago, Chicago Illinois
1957 – The Stable Gallery, New York
1958 – Provincetown Art Festival, Massachusetts
 1961 – Abstract Expressionists and Imagists, Guggenheim Museum, New York City, New York
 1964 – Post-painterly abstraction, Los Angeles County Museum of Art (LACMA), Los Angeles, California
1964-1966 –  Pennsylvania Academy of Fine Arts, Pennsylvania
 1965 – Post-painterly abstraction, Walker Art Center
1965 – Whitney Museum of American Art, New York City, New York
1965 – American Embassy Gallery, London
 1967 – Allentown Art Museum, Allentown, Pennsylvania
 1968 – Kornblee Gallery, New York City, New York
 1969–1985 – A.M. Sachs Gallery, New York City, New York (11 solo shows)
 1962–1969 – Roses Fried Gallery, New York City, New York (7 shows)
 1979 – Graduate Center, City University of New York, New York City, New York
 1985–2007 – Katharina Rich Perlow Gallery, New York City, New York (15 shows)
1986 – Hofstra University Museum of  Art, Hempstead, New York
 1993 – Parish Art Museum, Southampton, New York
 1993 – State University of New York, Stonybrook, New York
 1993 – Pollak-Krasner Study House, East Hampton, New York
1993 – Dallas Museum of Art, Dallas, Texas
1996 – Los Angeles County Museum of Art (LACMA), Los Angeles, California
 1998 – Rose Fried Gallery, New York City, New York
1998 – Michael Rosenfeld Gallery, New York City, New York
 2008 – Hollis Taggart Gallery, New York City, New York
 2009 – Spanierman Modern Gallery, New York City, New York
2010-2011 – Museum of Modern Art, New York, NY
 2013 – The Baker Museum, Naples, Florida
 2015 – David Findlay Jr. Gallery, New York, New York 
 2017 – Eric Firestone Gallery, East Hampton, New York
2017 – Peyton Wright Gallery, Santa Fe, New Mexico 
2021 – David Findlay Jr. Gallery, New York, New York

References

External links 
 Guggenheim Museum - John Ferren 
 John Ferren on Artnet
 Smithsonian American Art Museum - John Ferren

1905 births
1970 deaths
Abstract painters
Artists from Los Angeles
People from Pendleton, Oregon
Burials at Green River Cemetery
Brooklyn Museum Art School faculty
Cooper Union faculty
American expatriates in France